Sopot is a city in eastern Albania. It was part of the former municipality Stravaj. At the 2015 local government reform it became part of the municipality Prrenjas.

Geography
The area has natural attractions for tourism, such as the Gostima Waterfall, karstic caves, woods, a rich flora and fauna, and local ethnoculture.

History
According to a folkloric legend, during the Ottoman invasion of this mountainous part of Albania, women with their children flew from the castle's wall so as not to surrender to the Ottomans.

Following five hundred years of Ottoman occupation and islamisation, the population of Sopot now carries two names, one Moslem and one Christian.

The area's population has decreased lately due to immigration.

See also
 Sopoti Librazhd, football team

References

 
Populated places in Prrenjas